Sepen may refer to:

Sepen (sauce), a hot sauce in Tibetan cuisine
Sepen (language) one of the Ramu languages of Papua New Guinea